Ashkan Namdari is an Iranian retired football player and current coach. He played for Esteghlal and Aboomoslem in IPL as a goalkeeper.

Club career

Club career statistics
Last update 12 May 2010

Honours
Esteghlal
 Persian Gulf Pro League: 2008–09

External links
Persian League Profile

Iranian footballers
Association football defenders
F.C. Aboomoslem players
Bargh Shiraz players
Esteghlal F.C. players
Living people
1977 births